Hypsiglena chlorophaea, the desert night snake, is a species of snake in the family Colubridae.  The species is native to Mexico and the United States.

References

Hypsiglena
Reptiles of Mexico
Reptiles of the United States
Taxa named by Edward Drinker Cope
Reptiles described in 1860